Edward Askew  may refer to:
Edward Ayscu (1550–1617), English historian
Edward Askew Sothern (1826–1881), English actor